Anthony Russell Seratelli (born February 27, 1983) is an American former professional baseball second baseman. He has played professionally in independent baseball, Minor League Baseball for the Kansas City Royals and New York Mets organizations and Nippon Professional Baseball (NPB) for the Saitama Seibu Lions. Prior to his professional career, Seratelli attended Seton Hall University, and played college baseball for the Seton Hall Pirates.

Career
Seratelli attended Old Bridge High School in Old Bridge Township, New Jersey. At , Seratelli was too small to play American football or basketball. He joined the bowling team, but was cut from the school's baseball team as a freshman. He made the varsity baseball team in his junior year, playing shortstop. A leg injury suffered while running the bases prematurely ended his junior year. He threw perfect games for the bowling team as a freshman and as a junior.

Seratelli then enrolled at Seton Hall University. Now , he tried out for the Seton Hall Pirates baseball team as a walk-on during his freshman year, and made the team. He was voted team captain in his sophomore year. He was not selected in the Major League Baseball Draft after graduating from Seton Hall. After a workout in Chicago, he did not receive an offer from an MLB team, but was noticed by the Windy City ThunderBolts of the independent Frontier League, and he began his career with them in 2006.

In February 2007, Seratelli attended a tryout with the Kansas City Royals, who signed him to a minor league contract. While playing for the Northwest Arkansas Naturals of the Class AA Texas League in 2011, he was named an All-Star. After the 2011 season, the Royals named Seratelli their farm system's best baserunner, and assigned him to the Arizona Fall League.

After the 2013 season, Seratelli became a free agent. He signed a minor league contract with the Mets, receiving an invitation to spring training in 2014. The Mets evaluated Seratelli as a shortstop. At the end of spring training, the Mets chose Omar Quintanilla over Seratelli, and Seratelli began the season with the Las Vegas 51s of the Class AAA Pacific Coast League.

On December 12, 2014, Seratelli signed with the Saitama Seibu Lions of Nippon Professional Baseball.

Seratelli signed a minor league deal with the Arizona Diamondbacks in November 2015. However, he announced his retirement prior to the start of the 2016 season.

Business ventures
During his baseball career, Seratelli ventured into the business world forming a production company called ARS*1 Productions (his initials and college baseball number). After leaving baseball and diving into production full-time, he rebranded his company to Jersey Filmmaker in 2018, now known for its premier production team and global creative services.

Focusing on branded content along with scripted and unscripted pieces in sports, music and entertainment, Seratelli has worked with various networks and platforms to develop and execute both long and short features. In addition to his TV and broadcast relationships, Seratelli partners with top brands NASCAR, Fanatics and Walmart, reaching a wide audience with his work.

Seratelli produced and directed a 10-part racing docu-series for Fox Sports that reached millions of viewers. A Beautiful Lie, a documentary produced and filmed by Seratelli played in multiple Film Festivals as well as his Executive Produced and edited feature film, Double Belgian, streams on Amazon, Apple TV, Google Play and Fandango. He has also produced and edited a 5-part docs-series on internet celebrity Lele Pons in collaboration with Shots Studios, which is set to stream on YouTube Originals in May 2020.

Personal
Seratelli was born in Woodbridge Township, New Jersey. He and his family lived in his great-grandparents house early in his life. His family moved to Old Bridge when he entered the sixth grade. His parents divorced, and his mother moved to California, with Anthony and his sister, Danyel, staying with their father, Russell. During his sophomore year at Seton Hall, Seratelli began instructing 14-year-olds in baseball camps. Seratelli formed a production company, called ArS*1 Productions, in 2012, which became Jersey Filmmaker in 2018.

Russell and Danyel were involved in a motor collision in 2011 in which Russell died. Anthony referred to his father as "the greatest man that ever lived", and has dedicated his career to his memory.

His grandmother was born in Japan.

References

External links

Jersey Filmmaker

1983 births
American baseball players of Japanese descent
American expatriate baseball players in Japan
American people of Italian descent
Baseball players from New Jersey
Baseball second basemen
Idaho Falls Chukars players
Las Vegas 51s players
Living people
Northwest Arkansas Naturals players
Old Bridge High School alumni
Omaha Storm Chasers players
People from Old Bridge Township, New Jersey
People from Woodbridge Township, New Jersey
Saitama Seibu Lions players
Seton Hall Pirates baseball players
Sportspeople from Middlesex County, New Jersey
Wilmington Blue Rocks players
Windy City ThunderBolts players